Port O'Connor is an unincorporated community and census-designated place (CDP) in Calhoun County, Texas, United States, near the Gulf coastline between Galveston and Corpus Christi. The CDP had a population of 1,253 at the 2010 census. It is part of the Victoria, Texas metropolitan statistical area.

History
Port O'Connor was laid out in the late 19th century as a fishing settlement called "Alligator Head". As it grew in popularity with both permanent residents and tourists, the community took on more municipal characteristics, earning the formal designation finally in 1909 as the town site of Port O'Connor. It was named after its main landowner at the time, Thomas M. O'Connor, who owned . Aside from local cattle raising and fishing, the town was also a producer of figs and citrus fruit.

Its initial population growth spanned the years 1909 to 1919. Excursion trains ran on weekends to Port O'Connor, and an estimated 10,000 tourists came every summer.

Port O'Connor has been struck by four hurricanes since it was initially settled. The 1919 Florida Keys hurricane brought the "good old days" to a halt, destroying the town. It rebuilt slowly, but the 1942 and 1945 hurricanes so close in time were hard to overcome. In 1961, Port O'Connor was in the midst of another growth boom due to the increase of military personnel on nearby Matagorda Island Air Force Base. That same year, Hurricane Carla destroyed the town again, but times reflect its will to survive, fueled by tourism, commercial fisheries, and the petrochemical industry. Hurricane Harvey struck the town again in 2017.

Demographics

2020 census

As of the 2020 United States census, there were 954 people, 433 households, and 331 families residing in the CDP.

Education

Port O'Connor is served by the Calhoun County Independent School District.

Due to its small population, the town has only one school, Port O'Connor Elementary School, which has the dolphin as its mascot. Port O'Connor Elementary School covers prekindergarten through grade five. Children are then bused to the nearby town of Seadrift or to Port Lavaca to finish their sixth- through 12th-grade educations. The secondary schools that serve Port O'Connor are Seadrift Middle School, Travis Middle School, and Calhoun High School.

References

External links 
 Brief History
 Handbook of Texas Online article
 Tourist Welcome Site, Chamber of Commerce
 Live Cam Real Time Weather
 Port O'Connor Local Information and Events
 Port O'Connor Fishing Guides
 

Unincorporated communities in Texas
Census-designated places in Calhoun County, Texas
Victoria, Texas metropolitan area
Populated coastal places in Texas